The bob-tailed weaver (Brachycope anomala) is a species of bird in the family Ploceidae. It is monotypic within the genus Brachycope.
It is found in Cameroon, Central African Republic, Republic of the Congo, and Democratic Republic of the Congo.

References 

bob-tailed weaver
Birds of Central Africa
bob-tailed weaver
Taxonomy articles created by Polbot